Nóra Érfalvy (born June 9, 1970 in Budapest) is a retired Hungarian rhythmic gymnast.

She competed for Hungary in the rhythmic gymnastics all-around competition at the 1988 Olympic Games in Seoul, placing 20th in the qualification and 17th overall.

References 

 Nóra Érfalvy at Sports-Reference.com

1970 births
Living people
Hungarian rhythmic gymnasts
Gymnasts at the 1988 Summer Olympics
Olympic gymnasts of Hungary
Gymnasts from Budapest